Haughn is an Irish surname. It is an anglicized form of the Irish language Ó hEacháin, meaning "descendant of Eachán". The personal name Eachán is a diminutive of Eachaidh, a byname meaning "horseman", derived from each, "horse".

References

Anglicised Irish-language surnames